The list of shipwrecks in February 1832 includes ships sunk, foundered, grounded, or otherwise lost during February 1832.

1 February

2 February

3 February

4 February

5 February

6 February

7 February

8 February

9 February

10 February

12 February

14 February

16 February

18 February

19 February

20 February

21 February

22 February

24 February

25 February

26 February

29 February

Unknown date

References

1832-02